"King Kong" is a single released by the eurodance group E-Rotic in 2001. In 2005 was covered by J-Pop girl group Hinoi Team, and again in 2006 by the Germany-based J-pop group Shanadoo.

E-Rotic's version
In September 2001, E-Rotic released "King Kong" in Germany. One month later,  the song was featured in the album Sex Generation.

Music Video
Like most of E-Rotic's videos, King Kong is a surreal cartoon that takes place in the ongoing E-Rotic character universe. The video features a group of island natives with the intention of sacrificing three topless girls to a giant gorilla, a new character named "King Kong".

Some scenes from E-Rotic's previous music video, "Billy Jive (With Willy's Wife)", reappeared here.

Track listing

Hinoi Team version

In July, 2005 Hinoi Team release "King Kong" as the group's second single. This single was released only in Japan.

Although Hinoi Team's version retains a sprinkle of the English lyrics, this version was re-written in Japanese. The lyrics also change the sexual innuendo theme of the song into a childlike love song.

Music Video
The video features Hinoi Team dancing in front of a waterfall, with solo scenes in a fantasy-like garden. They dance the para para routine for King Kong, a popular style of dance in Japan.

Track listing

Shanadoo version

In 2006, Shanadoo debuted in Germany with the single, "King Kong." It is a cover of Hinoi Team's version of the song, opposed to the original lyrics in E-Rotic's version. This single was not released in Japan, although it was included in the album Welcome to Tokyo, which did have a Japanese release.

Music Video
Shanadoo's music video features the group dancing in a pink room. They also perform the para para routine for "King Kong" in this video.

Track listing

References 

2001 singles
2005 singles
2006 singles
Animated music videos
E-Rotic songs
Songs written by David Brandes
Songs about fictional male characters
Songs about primates
2001 songs
King Kong (franchise)